The 14th Legislative Assembly of Himachal Pradesh is formed following the 2022 Assembly election for all 68 seats in the unicameral legislature. In December 2027, the 14th Assembly's term will come to an end.

Notable Position

Members of the Assembly

References 

Himachal Pradesh
Himachal Pradesh Legislative Assembly